John Quarry was Archdeacon of Cork  from 1894 until 1899.

Quarry was born in County Cork  and educated at Trinity College, Dublin. He was ordained in 1833 and began his career with a curacy  at Shandon, Cork. He held incumbencies at Kilaughnabeg, Kilmacabea, Kilgarriff, Desertmore and Midleton.

References

Alumni of Trinity College Dublin
Archdeacons of Cork
19th-century Irish Anglican priests